Mycerinodes lettowvorbecki is a species of beetle in the family Cerambycidae. It was described by Kriesche in 1926, originally spelled as "Mycerinodes Lettow-Vorbecki".

References

Morimopsini
Beetles described in 1926